The superior medullary velum (anterior medullary velum) is a thin, transparent lamina of white matter, which stretches between the superior cerebellar peduncles; on the dorsal surface of its lower half the folia and lingula are prolonged.

It forms, together with the superior cerebellar peduncle, the roof of the upper part of the fourth ventricle; it is narrow above, where it passes beneath the facial colliculi, and broader below, where it is continuous with the white substance of the superior vermis.

A slightly elevated ridge, the frenulum veli, descends upon its upper part from between the inferior colliculi, and on either side of this the trochlear nerve emerges.

Blood is supplied by branches from the superior cerebellar artery.

Additional images

See also
 Inferior medullary velum

References

External links
 

Neuroanatomy